Peter Podlunšek (born May 25, 1970) is a Slovenian aerobatics pilot.

He competes in the Red Bull Air Race World Championship Challenger Cup competition. His first Red Bull Air Race was on 12 April 2014 in Rovinj where he took third place. He uses two racing aircraft; an Extra 300L and an Extra 330SC. He has flown aerobatic aircraft since 1994 and has won eight national championships in aerobatics. He is based in Slovenia's aerobatics hotbed of Murska Sobota. Since 2008 he has been flying the Extra 330SC and participated in more than 250 airshows across Europe, China and Libya. In his two decades of flying he has clocked more than 1,000 flight hours - 450 of those being in aerobatics.
Peter announced that he will retire the master class pilot of Red Bull Air Race in the 2017 season.

Red Bull Air Race

Challenger Class

Master Class

*season in progress
Legend:
 CAN - cancelled
 DNP - did not participate
 DNS -  did not show
 DQ - disqualified
 NC - not classified

See also
 Competition aerobatics

References

External links 

 Peter Podlunšek
 Peter Podlunšek - Red Bull Air Race profile

1970 births
Living people
Aerobatic pilots
Slovenian aviators
Slovenian air racers
Red Bull Air Race World Championship pilots